Turned v (majuscule: Ʌ, minuscule: ʌ) is a letter of the Latin alphabet, based on a turned form of the letter V.

It is used in the orthographies of Dan, Ch’ol, Nankina, Northern Tepehuán, Temne, Oneida, and Wounaan and also some orthographies of Ibibio.

Its lowercase is used in the International Phonetic Alphabet to represent an open-mid back unrounded vowel, the vowel in plus in many dialects of English.

Despite the similarity in appearance, the letter has no connection to the Greek Λ, Chinese/Japanese 人 or Korean ㅅ.

Character encoding

Related characters

Descendants and related letters in the Latin alphabet
ʌ with diacritics: ʌ́ ʌ̀
ᶺ : Modifier letter small turned v is used in phonetic transcription

See also
Similar symbols:
 Caron
 Caret
 Circumflex
 Logical conjunction
 Chevron (insignia)

References

Bibliography 
 Urua, Eno-Abasi ; Moses Ekpenyong and Dafydd Gibbon. 2004. Uyo Ibibio Dictionary. Preprint draft. online copy

Latin-script letters
Phonetic transcription symbols